Jozev Kiu Ching-Fu  (born 6 February 1969) is a Hong Kongese wuxia novelist, lyricist and Eskrima coach. His magnum opus, Blood and Steel, had received widespread acclaim and Kiu is regarded as one of the leading figures of the post-Jin Yong Hong Kong Wuxia fiction genre.

Early life and education 
Kiu was born in Hong Kong on 6 February 1969. He had his secondary education in Cheung Sha Wan Catholic Secondary School and was classmate with lyricist Chow Pok Yin. He began to learn karate while he was 15 and he spent most of his secondary school life on basketball, gaming and reading manga. He later attended The City University of Hong Kong and graduated with a bachelor's degree in translation.

Career

Writing 
Kiu began to write Wuxia fiction and completed his first novel, The Unparalleled Statesman (Chinese: 國士無雙), during his university years. Kiu published his debut novel The Blade of the Phantom Kingdom (Chinese: 幻國之刃) in 1996, and he began to receive public attention. He later also wrote The Vampire Hunter’s Diaries (Chinese: 吸血鬼獵人日誌) and The Killing Zen (Chinese: 殺禪), of which the latter took Kiu ten years to finish. The lengthy writing process earned him the nickname of “Hong Kong’s greatest procrastinating writer” (Chinese: 香江第一遲筆).

In 2008, he started another novel series, Blood and Steel (Chinese: 武道狂之詩), and published it online. The series was generally perceived as a milestone of the reformed Hong Kong Wuxia genre as it differed from the traditional Wuxia fiction which put emphasis on the code of chivalry and Chinese traditions. Besides, Kiu was also one of the few Wuxia novelists who possessed a martial arts background, and the realistic action sequences in the novel series received universal praise. After the success of Blood and Steel, Kiu was widely regarded as a leading figure of the New Wuxia genre in the post-Jin Yong era.

Kiu had also composed lyrics for Cantopop songs since 1998. He won the Yearly Best Lyricist Prize of the Composers and Authors Society of Hong Kong in 2000 with Candy Lo's Dark Blue (Chinese: 深藍).

Martial arts 
Kiu is skilled in karate, Wing Chun and Eskrima. Kiu began to learn karate when he was 15 and obtained a brown belt. He began to practice Eskrima in 2009 and participated in several international competitions. He had also received professional training in the Philippines in 2012, and served as a guest host of the RTHK martial arts documentary series, Kung Fu Quest (Chinese: 功夫傳奇), for several years. He also co-founded and taught at Kalis Brotherhood, an Eskrima coaching school.

Personal life 
Kiu was married in March 2011.

Kiu was a supporter of the Anti-Extradition Law Amendment Bill Movement. He wrote essays to express his political views and had compared the protests with Bruce Lee’s philosophy of errantry.

Bibliography 
The Blade of the Phantom Kingdom (Chinese: 幻國之刃; 1996)
The Vampire Hunter’s Diaries (Chinese: 吸血鬼獵人日誌; 2004)
The Killing Zen (Chinese: 殺禪; 2007)
Blood and Steel (Chinese: 武道狂之詩; 2008–2018)

References

External links 
Jozev Kiu’s personal blog

Hong Kong novelists
Wuxia writers
Hong Kong columnists
Hong Kong songwriters
Alumni of the City University of Hong Kong
1969 births
Living people